Eye dialect is the use of deliberately nonstandard spelling for standard pronunciation. The term was coined by George Philip Krapp to refer to a literary technique that implies the standard pronunciation of a given word that is not well-reflected by its standard spelling, such as wimmin to more accurately represent the typical English pronunciation of women. However, eye dialect is also commonly used to indicate that a character's speech is vernacular (nonstandard), foreign, or uneducated. This form of nonstandard spelling differs from others in that a difference in spelling does not indicate a difference in pronunciation of a word.  That is, it is dialect to the eye, rather than to the ear.

Use
Most authors are likely to use eye dialect with restraint, sprinkling nonstandard misspelling here and there to serve as a cue to the reader about all of a character's speech, rather than as an accurate phonetic representation.

While mostly used in dialogue, eye dialect may appear in the narrative depiction of altered spelling made by a character (such as in a letter or diary entry), generally used to more overtly depict characters who are poorly educated or semi-literate.

The term eye dialect was first used by George Philip Krapp in 1925. "The convention violated", he wrote, "is one of the eyes, not of the ear." According to Krapp, it was not used to indicate a real difference in pronunciation but 

The term is less commonly used to refer to pronunciation spellings, that is, spellings of words that indicate that they are pronounced in a nonstandard way.  For example, an author might write dat as an attempt at accurate transcription of a nonstandard pronunciation of that.

In an article on written representations of speech in a non-literary context, such as transcription by sociolinguists, Denis R. Preston argued that such spellings serve mainly to "denigrate the speaker so represented by making him or her appear boorish, uneducated, rustic, gangsterish, and so on".

Jane Raymond Walpole points out that there are other ways to indicate speech variation such as altered syntax, punctuation, and colloquial or regional word choices. She observes that a reader must be prompted to access their memory of a given speech pattern and that non-orthographic signals that accomplish this may be more effective than eye dialect. Frank Nuessel points out that use of eye dialect closely interacts with stereotypes about various groups, both relying on and reinforcing them in an attempt to efficiently characterize speech.

In The Lie That Tells a Truth: A Guide to Writing Fiction, John Dufresne cites The Columbia Guide to Standard American English in suggesting that writers avoid eye dialect; he argues that it is frequently pejorative, making a character seem stupid rather than regional, and is more distracting than helpful. Like Walpole, Dufresne suggests that dialect should be rendered by "rhythm of the prose, by the syntax, the diction, idioms and figures of speech, by the vocabulary indigenous to the locale". Other writers have noted that eye dialect has sometimes been used in derisive fashion toward ethnic or regional pronunciation, in particular by contrasting standard spelling with non-standard spelling to emphasize differences.

Eye dialect, when consistently applied, may render a character's speech indecipherable.  An attempt to accurately render nonstandard speech may also prove difficult to readers unfamiliar with a particular accent.

Examples in English

Prose fiction
Some authors who use eye dialect include Harriet Beecher Stowe, Maya Angelou, Charles Dickens, William Faulkner, Greer Gilman, Alex Haley, Joel Chandler Harris, Russell Hoban, Terry Pratchett, James Whitcomb Riley, J. K. Rowling, Robert Ruark, John Steinbeck, Mark Twain, Maxine Beneba Clarke, Paul Howard, Finley Peter Dunne, and Irvine Welsh. 

Charles Dickens combined eye dialect with pronunciation spelling and nonstandard grammar in the speech of his uneducated characters. An example in Bleak House is the following dialogue spoken by Jo, the miserable boy who sweeps a path across a street:

Here wos, sed, and wuns indicate standard pronunciations.

In his Discworld series of books, Terry Pratchett makes extensive use of eye dialect to extend the caricature of his characters, besides other visual devices such as changing the font used for certain dialogue. Death, for example, speaks in small capitals, while the dialogue of a golem, who can communicate only by writing, resembles Hebrew script in reference to the origins of the golem legend. Eye dialect is also used to establish a medieval setting, wherein many characters' grasp of spelling is heavily based on phonetics.

Poetry
In his 1937 poem "The Arrest of Oscar Wilde at the Cadogan Hotel", John Betjeman deploys eye dialect on a handful of words for satirical effect; in this case the folly of the arresting police officers, who are made to seem like comic caricatures of themselves:

Mr. Woilde, we 'ave come for tew take yew
Where felons and criminals dwell:
We must ask yew tew leave with us quoietly
For this is the Cadogan Hotel.

An extreme example of a poem written entirely in (visually barely decipherable) eye dialect is "YgUDuh" by E. E. Cummings, which, as several commentators have noted, makes sense only when read aloud. In this case, Cummings's target was the attitudes of certain Americans to Japanese people following World War II.

In comics
American cartoonist Al Capp frequently combined eye dialect with pronunciation spelling in his comic strip Li'l Abner.  Examples include l [mountain], and perhaps the most common, .  Only his rustic characters are given these spellings; for instance, the "overcivilized" Bounder J. Roundheels's dialogue contains gourmets, while Li'l Abner's contains .

Cartoonist Walt Kelly made extensive use of eye dialect in Pogo. Like Pratchett, he used unique fonts for many of his supporting characters.

Some cartoonists and comic book creators eschew phonetic eye dialects in favor of font changes or distinctive speech balloons. Swamp Thing, for example, has traditionally been depicted using "crusty" yellow speech balloons and dialogue heavily laced with ellipses, suggesting a gravelly voice that only speaks with great effort. Robotic and computer characters often use square speech balloons and angular fonts reminiscent of OCR-A, suggesting a stilted, emotionless cadence.

Other uses
American film director Quentin Tarantino used eye dialect for the title of his movie Inglourious Basterds.

Examples in other languages 

In the Chilean comic Mampato, the character Ogú replaces hard ⟨c⟩ with ⟨k⟩ (e.g. ⟨komida⟩ instead of ⟨comida⟩), to show that his accent is strange.

In contemporary Russian literature, eye spelling is not uncommon. For example, in the Vasiliy Shukshin's story "Мой зять украл машину дров" (My son-in-law stole a carful of firewood) the word for what is spelled "што" (as it is pronounced in contemporary Russian, so ), rather than the expected "что". The character is a delivery driver in Siberia and the eye dialect emphasizes his uneducated nature.

The novel Zazie dans le Métro is written in French that disregards almost all French spelling conventions, as the main viewpoint character is a young child.

Italian dialectal literature tends to spell ⟨zz⟩ instead of ⟨z⟩ (eg: posizzione in place of standard posizione) and syntactic gemination (eg: ho ffatto in place of standard ho fatto), actually reflecting the standard pronunciation.

Norwegian author Hans Jæger's trilogy, The Erotic Confessions of the Bohemians (1893–1903), is written in a Norwegian form of eye dialect.

See also 
 Apologetic apostrophe
 Eye rhyme
 Hypercorrection
 Inventive spelling
 Mondegreen
 Preved
 Satiric misspelling
 Sensational spelling
 Spelling pronunciation
 SMS language

Notes

References

Further reading

 Bowdre, Paul H., Jr. (1971). Eye dialect as a literary device. In J. V. Williamson & V. M. Burke (Eds.), A various language (pp. 178–179). New York: Holt, Rinehart & Winston.
 Fine, Elizabeth. (1983). In defense of literary dialect: A response to Dennis R. Preston. The Journal of American Folklore, 96 (381), 323–330.
 Ives, Sumner. (1950). A theory of literary dialect. Tulane Studies in English, 2, 137–182.
 Ives, Sumner. (1971). A theory of literary dialect. In J. V. Williamson & V. M. Burke (Eds.), A various language (pp. 145–177). New York: Holt, Rinehart & Winston.
 Krapp, George P. (1926). The psychology of dialect writing. The Bookman, 63, 522–527.
 Macaulay, Ronald K. S. (1991). Coz It Izny Spelt When Then Say It: Displaying Dialect in Writing. American Speech, 66 (3), 280–291.
 Preston, Dennis R. (1982). Ritin' fowklower daun 'rong: Folklorists' failures in phonology. The Journal of American Folklore, 95 (377), 304–326.
 Preston, Dennis R. (1983). Mowr bayud spellin': A reply to Fine. The Journal of American Folklore, 96 (381), 330–339.
 Preston, Dennis R. (1985). The Li'l Abner syndrome: Written representations of speech. American Speech, 60 (4), 328–336.

External links
 

Orthography
Nonstandard spelling
Linguistic error
Narrative techniques